"Computer Games" is a song by New Zealand band Mi-Sex, released in September 1979 in Australia and New Zealand as the second single from their debut studio album, Graffiti Crimes (1979). The song peaked at number 1 in Australia and 5 in New Zealand. The music video was filmed on location at what was at the time Control Data Corporation's North Sydney centre and included gameplay from the 1979 arcade games Speed Freak, Basketball and Star Fire. The single won the award for Best Australian Single at the 1979 TV Week/Countdown Music Awards.

The single was also released in Europe and North America, as well as South Africa where the band's name was altered to MS to satisfy censorship.

The song was also re-recorded as the final track for the band's 1983 album Where Do They Go?, a dub version was the 12" B-side of their 1983 single "Lost Time" and again on the 2016 EP Extended Play.

Reception
Musicologist Ian McFarlane opined that it was an "electro-pop anthem... with its simplistic, brain-teasing riff and Gilpin's mannered vocal yelps, "Computer Games" boasted little substance but was constructed for maximum effect. It came to epitomise the one word which has plagued the memory of Mi-Sex: 'contrived'."

Stewart Mason from AllMusic said "Steve Gilpin's theatrical vocals, full of Brian Connolly-style hiccups and leaps into falsetto, are an interesting counterpoint to the unvarying electronic rhythm, particularly on the memorable stuttering chorus." Cash Box said, "This avant-pop band has taken the sound first pioneered by Eno and Ultravox and molded it into more of a hard rock sound. The band employs witty future-orientated lyrics to augment the swirling synthesized sounds."

Track listings
Australia/New Zealand 7" (BA 222563)
 "Computer Games" – 3:54	
 "Wot Do You Want?" – 2:55

Australian 12"
 "Computer Games" (Disco Version) – 4:41
 "Graffiti Crimes" – 3:49	
 		 	 Spanish version "Juego De Computadoras (Computer Games)" – 3:54
 "Que Queres? (Wot Do You Want?)" – 2:55United Kingdom dance version'''
 "Computer Games"  (Special Dance Mix)  – 6:17
 "Wot Do You Want?" – 2:55

Charts

Weekly charts

Year-end charts

See also
 List of number-one singles in Australia during the 1970s

References

New Zealand songs
Mi-Sex songs
1979 singles
1981 singles
1979 songs
Number-one singles in Australia
CBS Records singles
Music based on video games
Song recordings produced by Peter Dawkins (musician)
Songs about video games